Heribert Schmid (born 8 September 1941) is a Swiss ski jumper. He competed in the normal hill and large hill events at the 1964 Winter Olympics.

References

1941 births
Living people
Swiss male ski jumpers
Olympic ski jumpers of Switzerland
Ski jumpers at the 1964 Winter Olympics
Place of birth missing (living people)